Leah Gaye Lauderback is a United States Air Force lieutenant general who serves as the deputy chief of staff for intelligence, surveillance, reconnaissance, and cyber effects operations of the United States Air Force since August 5, 2022. She most recently served as the director for intelligence, surveillance, and reconnaissance of the United States Space Force from 2020 to 2022. She previously served as the director of intelligence of the United States Space Command and director for intelligence, surveillance and reconnaissance operations of the U.S. Air Force.

Awards and decorations

References 

 

 

Living people
Place of birth missing (living people)
Clemson University alumni
Central Michigan University alumni
National Intelligence University alumni
Naval War College alumni
United States Air Force generals
Female generals of the United States Air Force
Office of the Chief of Space Operations personnel
Recipients of the Defense Superior Service Medal
Recipients of the Legion of Merit
1971 births
21st-century American women